Elections to Sheffield City Council were held on 6 May 1982. One third of the council was up for election.

Election result

This result had the following consequences for the total number of seats on the Council after the elections:

Ward results

George Wilson was previously elected as a Labour councillor

Henry Hanwell was a sitting councillor for South Wortley

Donald Lemons was a sitting councillor for Heeley ward

Dorothy Podlesny was a sitting councillor for Southey Green

June Hibberd was a sitting councillor for Stocksbridge

Sam Wall was a sitting councillor for Norton ward

References

1982 English local elections
1982
1980s in Sheffield
May 1982 events in the United Kingdom